is an operator of inter-city and local bus lines based in Hokkaido, Japan. A 100% subsidiary of the Hokkaido Railway Company (JR Hokkaido), JR Hokkaido Bus is one of eight JR Bus companies within Japan Railways Group (JR Group).

JR Hokkaido Bus operates routes connecting Hokkaido cities, as well as local city services in Sapporo.

Overview
Besides providing bus service inside the city of Sapporo, JR Hokkaido Bus also operates chartered buses. Its central business is transportation between the city center and residential areas, such as Teine and Atsubetsu; with some services starting from the bus terminals at subway stations.

The regional bus routes were originally established to complement the company's railway services, but were subsequently transferred to local carriers following a financial downturn in the company.

Business offices 

Sapporo Chuo, Head Office
Otaru branch
Teine-ku, Sapporo branch
Kotoni Sapporo branch
Chūō-ku, Sapporo branch
Atsubetsu-ku, Sapporo Sales Office
Minami Naganuma Sales Office
Fukagawa branch
Samani branch
Teine-ku, Sapporo Maintenance Center
Hokkaido Travel Center store Apia
Teine Station (Smart Oil Teine stores)
Kotoni Station (Smart Oil Kotoni Branch) 
Atsubetsu Station (Smart Oil Atsubetsu store)

Highway bus routes

Sapporo - Otaru
Sapporo - Asahikawa
Sapporo - Obihiro
Sapporo - Monbetsu
Sapporo - Erimo
Sapporo - Hiroo

See also

Hokkaido Chuo Bus

External links

  

Hokkaido Railway Company
Bus companies of Japan
Companies based in Sapporo